A chiral shift reagent is a reagent used in analytical chemistry for determining the optical purity of a sample.  Some analytical techniques such as HPLC and NMR, in their most commons forms, cannot distinguish enantiomers within a sample, but can distinguish diastereomers.  Therefore, converting a mixture of enantiomers to a corresponding mixture of diastereomers can allow analysis.

One method involves the reaction of a chiral derivatizing agent (CDA) with a mixture of enantiomers to produce diastereomers via covalent attachment.  One of the most common CDA is Mosher's acid.

Another method involves non-covalent interactions.  NMR shift reagents such as EuFOD, Pirkle's alcohol, and TRISPHAT take advantage of the formation of diastereomeric complexes between the shift reagent and the analytical sample.

References

Analytical reagents
Reagents for organic chemistry